In mathematics, uniformly convex spaces (or uniformly rotund spaces) are common examples of  reflexive Banach spaces. The concept of uniform convexity was first introduced by James A. Clarkson in 1936.

Definition 

implies that:

Intuitively, the center of a line segment inside the unit ball must lie deep inside the unit ball unless the segment is short.

Properties 
 The unit sphere can be replaced with the closed unit ball in the definition.

The "if" part is trivial. Conversely, assume now that  is uniformly convex and that  are as in the statement, for some fixed .

If  then  and the claim is proved. A similar argument applies for the case , so we can assume that . We have   and similarly , so  and  belong to the unit sphere and have distance . It follows that  and the claim is proved.

 The Milman–Pettis theorem states that every uniformly convex Banach space is reflexive, while the converse is not true.
 A Banach space  is uniformly convex if and only if its dual  is uniformly smooth.
 Every uniformly convex space is strictly convex. Intuitively, the strict convexity means a stronger triangle inequality   whenever  are linearly independent, while the uniform convexity requires this inequality to be true uniformly.

Examples 

 Every Hilbert space is uniformly convex.
 Every closed subspace of a uniformly convex Banach space is uniformly convex.
 Hanner's inequalities imply that Lp spaces  are uniformly convex.
 Conversely,  is not uniformly convex.

See also

 Modulus and characteristic of convexity
 Uniformly convex function
 Uniformly smooth space

References 
 .
 .

 
 Lindenstrauss, Joram and Benyamini, Yoav. Geometric nonlinear functional analysis Colloquium publications, 48. American Mathematical Society.

Convex analysis
Banach spaces